Cyperus diwakarii is a species of sedge that is native to parts of India.

See also 
 List of Cyperus species

References 

diwakarii
Plants described in 2006
Flora of India